Nemanja Dimitrijević, (born  February 7, 1992, in Belgrad) is a Paralympian athlete from Serbia. He competes in Javelin Throw in the F13, T13 classification.
At the 2016 Summer Paralympics held in Rio, he won a bronze medal in athletics.

References

Paralympic athletes of Serbia
Athletes (track and field) at the 2016 Summer Paralympics
Paralympic bronze medalists for Serbia
Living people
1992 births
Athletes from Belgrade
Medalists at the 2016 Summer Paralympics
Track and field athletes with disabilities
Serbian people with disabilities
Sportsmen with disabilities
Club throwers
Serbian male javelin throwers
Paralympic medalists in athletics (track and field)
Visually impaired javelin throwers